Yusuf ibn Umar ibn Shu'ayb was the fifth Emir of Crete, reigning from .

The surviving records on the internal history and rulers of the Emirate of Crete are very fragmentary. He is tentatively identified as a son of the third emir, Abu Abdallah Umar (II), and the grandson of the conqueror of Crete and founder of the emirate, Abu Hafs Umar.

In 909/10, the unnamed author of the hagiography of Theoktiste of Lesbos was sent to Crete as an envoy to ascertain whether the local Arabs would make common cause with the Abbasid fleets operating from Syria. In 911, the Byzantines launched a large-scale expedition, with over 100 ships and 43,000 men, to recapture the island, but were driven off. On its return journey, the Byzantine fleet was destroyed in an ambush off Chios by the Syrian fleet. Yusuf is presumably the unnamed Emir of Crete addressed in a letter by Patriarch Nicholas I Mystikos in 913/14.

He was succeeded by his son, Ali.

References

Sources
 
 
 
 

10th-century Arabs
10th-century rulers in Europe
Emirs of Crete
Arab people of the Arab–Byzantine wars
People from Crete